Alice Garlisi (born 3 July 1991) is an Italian retired figure skater. She placed 13th at the 2011 World Junior Championships and 21st at the 2011 European Championships.

Programs

Competitive highlights 
JGP: Junior Grand Prix

References

External links 

 
 Alice Garlisi at Figure Skating Online

Italian female single skaters
1991 births
Living people
Figure skaters from Milan
Competitors at the 2011 Winter Universiade
20th-century Italian women
21st-century Italian women